Cognitive disorders (CDs), also known as neurocognitive disorders (NCDs), are a category of mental health disorders that primarily affect cognitive abilities including learning, memory, perception, and problem solving. Neurocognitive disorders include delirium, mild neurocognitive disorders, and major neurocognitive disorder (previously known as dementia). They are defined by deficits in cognitive ability that are acquired (as opposed to developmental), typically represent decline, and may have an underlying brain pathology. The DSM-5 defines six key domains of cognitive function: executive function, learning and memory, perceptual-motor function, language, complex attention, and social cognition.

Although Alzheimer's disease accounts for the majority of cases of neurocognitive disorders, there are various medical conditions that affect mental functions such as memory, thinking, and the ability to reason, including frontotemporal degeneration, Huntington's disease, dementia with Lewy bodies, traumatic brain injury (TBI), Parkinson's disease, prion disease, and dementia/neurocognitive issues due to HIV infection. Neurocognitive disorders are diagnosed as mild and major based on the severity of their symptoms. While anxiety disorders, mood disorders, and psychotic disorders can also have an effect on cognitive and memory functions, they are not classified under neurocognitive disorders because loss of cognitive function is not the primary (causal) symptom. Additionally, developmental disorders such as autism typically have a genetic basis and become apparent at birth or early in life as opposed to the acquired nature of neurocognitive disorders.

Causes vary between the different types of disorders but most include damage to the memory portions of the brain.  Treatments depend on how the disorder is caused.  Medication and therapies are the most common treatments; however, for some types of disorders such as certain types of amnesia, treatments can suppress the symptoms but there is currently no cure.

Classifications 
The previous edition of the Diagnostic and Statistical Manual of Mental Disorders (DSM-IV) included a section entitled "Delirium, Dementia and Amnestic and Other Cognitive Disorders," which was revised in DSM-5 to the broader "Neurocognitive Disorders." Neurocognitive disorders are described as those with "a significant impairment of cognition or memory that represents a marked deterioration from a previous level of function". The main principle distinguishing neurocognitive disorders from mood disorders and other psychiatric conditions that involve a cognitive component (i.e. increased lapses in memory noted by patients with depression) is that cognitive decline is the "defining characteristic" of the disorder. Additionally, the term "neurocognitive" was added because these disorders most often have alterations/disfunction in neural physiology (i.e. amyloid plaque build-up in Alzheimer disease). The subsections include delirium, mild neurocognitive disorder, and major neurocognitive disorder.

Delirium 
Delirium is a type of neurocognitive disorder that develops rapidly over a short period of time. Delirium may be described using many other terms, including: encephalopathy, altered mental status, altered level of consciousness, acute mental status change, and brain failure. It is described in the DSM-5 as a fluctuating acute change in mental status with associated changes in cognition, attention, and level of consciousness. The onset of delirium can vary from minutes to hours and sometimes days. However, the course of the delirium typically lasts from a few hours to weeks, depending on the underlying cause. Delirium can also be accompanied by a shift in attention, mood swings, violent or unordinary behaviors, and hallucinations. Additionally, changes in cognition can makes situational awareness and processing new information very difficult for patients. Delirium is most common in hospitalized patients, appearing in 18-35% of patients requiring hospital admission. It is also a diagnosis which can be acquired during hospital stays, typically by elderly patients or those with risk factors of delirium. While it is a common diagnosis, delirium can increase the risk of a longer hospital stay and the risk of complications throughout the hospital stay.

Mild Neurocognitive Disorder 
Mild neurocognitive disorders, also referred to as mild cognitive impairment (MCI), can be thought of as a middle ground between normal aging and major neurocognitive disorder. Unlike delirium, mild neurocognitive disorders tend to develop slowly and are characterized by a progressive memory loss which may or may not progress to major neurocognitive disorder. Studies have shown that between 5-17% of patients with mild cognitive disorder will progress to major neurocognitive disorder each year. The likelihood of developing mild neurocognitive disorder increases with age, affecting 10-20% of adults ages 65 and older. Men also seem to be at a higher risk of developing mild neurocognitive disorder. In addition to memory loss and cognitive impairment, other symptoms include aphasia, apraxia, agnosia, loss of abstract thought, behavioral/personality changes, and impaired judgment.

Major Neurocognitive Disorder 
Mild and major neurocognitive disorders are differentiated based on the severity of their symptoms. Also still known as dementia, major neurocognitive disorder is characterized by significant cognitive decline and interference with independence, while mild neurocognitive disorder is characterized by moderate cognitive decline and does not interfere with independence. To be diagnosed, it must not be due to delirium or other mental disorder. They are also usually accompanied by another cognitive dysfunction.  For non-reversible causes of dementia such as age, the slow decline of memory and cognition is lifelong.

Diagnostic Methods 
There are multiple testing methods used to assess a patient's cognition and level of consciousness, including the Mini Mental Status Exam (MMSE), Montreal Cognitive Assessment (MoCA), Mini-Cog, and Cognitive Assessment Method (CAM), Glasgow Coma Score (GCS), Richmond Agitation and Sedation Scale (RASS), etc. The CAM has been shown to be the most commonly used tool to assess for delirium. Additionally, a meta-analysis looking at the accuracy and usefulness of the various testing methods reported that the MMSE was the most commonly used tool to evaluate major neurocognitive disorder, while the MoCA appeared to be the most useful when screening for minor neurocognitive disorder.

Causes

Delirium 
There are many causes of delirium, and many times there are multiple factors that can be contributing to delirium, particularly in the hospital setting. Common potential causes of delirium include new or worsening infections (i.e. urinary tract infections, pneumonia, and sepsis), neurological injury/infections (i.e. stroke and meningitis), environmental factors (i.e. immobilization and sleep deprivation), and medication/drug use (i.e. side effects of new medications, drug interactions, and use/withdrawal from recreational drugs).

Mild and major neurocognitive disorder 
Neurocognitive disorders can have numerous causes: genetics, brain trauma, stroke, and heart issues. The main causes are neurodegenerative diseases such as Alzheimer's disease, Parkinson's disease, and Huntington's disease because they affect or deteriorate brain functions. Other diseases and conditions that cause NCDs include vascular dementia, frontotemporal degeneration, Lewy body disease, prion disease, normal pressure hydrocephalus, and dementia/neurocognitive issues due to HIV infection. They may also include dementia due to substance abuse or exposure to toxins.

Neurocognitive disorders may also be caused by brain trauma, including concussions and traumatic brain injuries, as well as post-traumatic stress and alcoholism. This is referred to as amnesia, and is characterized by damage to major memory encoding parts of the brain such as the hippocampus. Difficulty creating recent term memories is called anterograde amnesia and is caused by damage to the hippocampus part of the brain, which is a major part of the memory process. Retrograde amnesia is also caused by damage to the hippocampus, but the memories that were encoded or in the process of being encoded in long-term memory are erased

Treatment

Delirium 
The overarching principle of delirium treatment is finding and treating the underlying cause. If the patient is truly experiencing delirium, their symptoms should begin improving/resolving with proper treatment of their illness, intoxication, etc. Medication such as antipsychotics or benzodiazepines can help reduce the symptoms for some cases. For alcohol or malnourished cases, vitamin B supplements are recommended and for extreme cases, life-support can be used.

Mild and Major Neurocognitive Disorder 
There is no cure for neurocognitive disorder or the diseases that cause it. Antidepressants, antipsychotics, and other medications that help slow the progression of memory loss/behavioral symptoms are available and may help to treat the diseases. Ongoing psychotherapy and psychosocial support for patients and families are usually necessary for clear understanding and proper management of the disorder and to maintain a better quality of life for everyone involved; although older patients with major neurocognitive disorders usually require assistance with their daily activities leading to placement in long-term care homes. Speech therapy has been shown to help with language impairment, therefore improving long-term development and academic outcome.

Studies suggest that diets with high Omega 3 content, low in saturated fats and sugars, along with regular exercise can increase the level of brain plasticity.  Other studies have shown that mental exercise such a newly developed "computerized brain training programs" can also help build and maintain targeted specific areas of the brain.  These studies have been very successful for those diagnosed with schizophrenia and can improve fluid intelligence, the ability to adapt and deal with new problems or challenges the first time encountered, and in young people, it can still be effective in later life.

See also
 List of cognitive disorders

References